In March 2022, the government imposed price controls in response to protests. In July 2022, peaceful protests were held in Tirana, Albania, against corruption and the cost of living crisis. It was organised by the Democratic Party and was attended by its leader former Prime Minister Sali Berisha. The protestors are demanding for the resignation of Prime Minister Edi Rama and his government. Price hikes have reportedly made food and energy costs raise.

References 

2022 protests
July 2022 events in Europe
2022 in Albania